The Outer Coastal Plain AVA is an American Viticultural Area located in southeastern New Jersey.  The recently expanded  wine appellation includes all of Cumberland, Cape May, Atlantic, and Ocean counties and portions of Salem, Gloucester, Camden, Burlington, and Monmouth counties. The region is characterized by well-drained sandy or sandy loam soils of low to moderate fertility, and a relatively long growing season. The climate is moderated by the influence of the Atlantic Ocean and Delaware Bay. The region is in hardiness zones 6b, 7a, and 7b. The AVA contains one sub-region, the Cape May Peninsula AVA, which was established in 2018.

Boundary
The Federal Register describes the Outer Coastal Plain AVA as being an area "roughly triangular in shape and comprises the most easterly and southerly portions of New Jersey, including most of the State's Atlantic coastline and the area known as the Pine Barrens.  It was drawn by the following boundaries:
The Outer Coastal Plain viticultural area includes all of Cumberland, Cape May, Atlantic, and Ocean Counties and portions of Salem, Gloucester, Camden, Burlington, and Monmouth Counties in the State of New Jersey. The boundary of the Outer Coastal Plain 
viticultural area is as described below.
(1) The beginning point is on the Wilmington map at the confluence of Alloway Creek with the Delaware River (within Mad Horse Creek State Wildlife Management Area) in Salem County;
(2) From the beginning point, proceed northeasterly in a straight line to the village of Hagerville; then
(3) Continue north on an unnamed road locally known as County Road (CR) 658 to its intersection with State Route (SR) 49; then
(4) Proceed northwesterly on SR 49 to its intersection with SR 45 in the center of the town of Salem; then
(5) Proceed northeasterly on SR 45 to its intersection with SR 540 at the village of Pointers; then 
(6) Proceed north on SR 540 into the village of Slapes Corner; then
(7) In Slapes Corner, proceed northeasterly on an unnamed road locally known as CR 646 to its intersection with the New Jersey Turnpike near the village of Auburn; then
(8) Proceed northeasterly on the New Jersey Turnpike for approximately 18 miles to its intersection with SR 47; then
(9) Proceed south on SR 47 for approximately 0.5 mile to its intersection with SR 534 at the village of Gardenville Center; then
(10) Proceed southeasterly through Gardenville Center on SR 534 to its intersection with SR 544; then
(11) Proceed northeasterly on SR 544 to its intersection with SR 73 on the Hammonton map; then
(12) Proceed north-northwesterly on SR 73 to its intersection with SR 70 in Cropwell; then
(13) Proceed east on SR 70 to its intersection with U.S. 206 in Red Lion; then
(14) Proceed north on U.S. 206, onto the Trenton map, to the village of Chambers Corner; then
(15) Proceed northeasterly on an unnamed road locally known as CR 537, through the village of Jobstown; then
(16) Continue northeasterly on CR 537, through the villages of Smithburg and Freehold, to its intersection with SR 18; then
(17) Proceed easterly on SR 18 to its intersection with the Garden State Parkway; then
(18) Proceed north on the Garden State Parkway and immediately exit onto SR 36 East and onto the Long Branch map; then
(19) Using the Long Branch map, continue east on SR 36 to where it intersects with Joline Avenue; then
(20) Proceed northeasterly on Joline Avenue to the Atlantic Ocean shoreline; then
(21) Follow the Atlantic Ocean shoreline south, encompassing all coastal islands, onto the Trenton, Hammonton, Atlantic City, and Cape May maps, to the city of Cape May; then
(22) Proceed west, then north, along the eastern bank of the Delaware River, onto the Atlantic City, Dover, and Wilmington maps to the beginning point.

Wineries 
, there are 32 wineries in the Outer Coastal Plain AVA (including the 7 wineries in the Cape May Peninsula AVA). Most of the wineries in this AVA are also members of the Outer Coastal Plain Vineyard Association, an industry trade organization "dedicated to the establishment and promotion of sustainable and economically viable viticulture in the Outer Coastal Plain AVA of New Jersey."

 Amalthea Cellars in Atco
 Auburn Road Vineyards in Pilesgrove
 Autumn Lake Winery in Williamstown
 Balic Winery in Mays Landing
 Bellview Winery in Landisville
 Cape May Winery & Vineyard in North Cape May (CMP)
 Cedar Rose Vineyards in Millville
 Chestnut Run Farm in Pilesgrove
 Coda Rossa Winery in Franklinville
 DeMastro Vineyards in Vincentown
 DiBella Winery in Woolwich
 DiMatteo Vineyards in Hammonton
 Four JG's Orchards & Vineyards in Colts Neck
 G&W Winery in Rio Grande (CMP)
 Hawk Haven Vineyard & Winery in Rio Grande (CMP)
 Jessie Creek Winery in Dias Creek (CMP)
 Laurita Winery in New Egypt
 Monroeville Vineyard & Winery in Monroeville
 Natali Vineyards in Goshen (CMP)
 Plagido's Winery in Hammonton
 Renault Winery in Egg Harbor City and Galloway
 Salem Oak Vineyards in Pedricktown
 Sharrott Winery in Blue Anchor
 Summit City Winery in Glassboro
 Sylvin Farms Winery in Germania
 Tomasello Winery in Hammonton
 Turdo Vineyards & Winery in North Cape May (CMP)
 Valenzano Winery in Shamong
 Villari Vineyards in Deptford
 Wagonhouse Winery in South Harrison
 White Horse Winery in Hammonton
 William Heritage Winery in Mullica Hill
 Willow Creek Winery in West Cape May (CMP)

See also
Alcohol laws of New Jersey
Cape May Peninsula AVA
Central Delaware Valley AVA
Garden State Wine Growers Association
Judgment of Princeton
List of wineries, breweries, and distilleries in New Jersey
New Jersey Farm Winery Act
New Jersey wine
New Jersey Wine Industry Advisory Council
Warren Hills AVA

References

External links
Garden State Wine Growers Association
Outer Coastal Plain Vineyard Association

American Viticultural Areas
Geography of New Jersey
New Jersey wine
2007 establishments in New Jersey